Labutta District or Latputta District is a district in Ayeyarwady Region, Myanmar. Labutta District was established in 2008 after the region was hit by Cyclone Nargis in May 2008. The administrative seat is the town of Labutta (Latputta).

Townships
The district contains the following townships:
Labutta Township
Mawlamyinegyun Township

Districts of Myanmar
Ayeyarwady Region